The Musée Georges-Garret or Georges-Garret Museum is located in the city of Vesoul, in the Haute-Saône departement of eastern France.

The museum was created in 1882, and since 1981 has been installed in a former 17th-century Ursuline convent, comprising 14 rooms (9 fine art rooms and 5 archeology rooms) spread over two levels. The first level of the museum presents a collection of Gallo-Roman funerary steles as well as objects taken from various excavations in Haute-Saône (including those of an important villa from the 2nd century AD). The second level exhibits paintings and sculptures of the Middle Ages, Renaissance, and especially the 18th and 19th centuries.

The most significant holdings of the museum are paintings and sculptures by Jean-Léon Gérôme (1824–1904), who was born in Vesoul. Gérôme donated a number of his works to the museum during his lifetime, and his heirs donated more works after his death. These range from the very early Saint Vincent de Paul of 1847 to the very late self-portrait of the artist painting his statue The Ball Player of 1902. As result, the museum's Gérôme collection, displayed in several rooms, is without equal.

Displayed along with Gérôme are by works of artists of Haute-Saône whom he trained at the École des Beaux-Arts in Paris, beginning in 1864. These artists collectively became known as the École Haut-Saônoise, or School of Haute-Saône. They painted landscapes, scenes of country life, and portraits. Among the better known are Gustave Courtois, Jules-Alexis Muenier and Pascal Dagnan-Bouveret.

Gallery (chronological)

References

External links

 Musée Georges-Garret de Vesoul 

Vesoul
Georges-Garret
1882 establishments in France
Georges-Garret
Georges-Garret